The 2010–11 Al-Oruba F.C. season is the Al-Oruba Football Club of Yemen season from 2010–2011 season.

Current first team squad

Yemeni League

Matches

Results
Kickoff times are in GMT.

See also 
 2011–12 season

References

kooora.com - Arabic

Al-Oruba F.C. seasons
Al-Oruba F.C. season